Racinaea insularis is a plant species in the genus Racinaea. This species is endemic to the Galapagos Islands in Ecuador.

References

insularis
Flora of Ecuador